Turtle House, also known as Old Turtle House or Joab Center House, is a historic home located at Greenport in Columbia County, New York.  It was built about 1820 and is an outstanding and unusual example of Federal period architecture.  It has a distinctive lozenge-shaped main block with highly unusual double semi-circular porticos and symmetrical secondary wings.

It was added to the National Register of Historic Places in 2001.

References

External links
.

Houses on the National Register of Historic Places in New York (state)
Historic American Buildings Survey in New York (state)
Federal architecture in New York (state)
Houses completed in 1820
Houses in Columbia County, New York
National Register of Historic Places in Columbia County, New York